The Gorge River is a river on the West Coast of New Zealand. It arises in the Hope Blue River Range and flows south-west into the Tasman Sea. Its tributaries include the Duncan River and Jerry River. It passes through Cascade Forest. Its mouth is about 15 km north-east of Awarua Point. The Gorge Islands are very small islands near the mouth. At its mouth, it is a fast tidal river.

At the mouth of the river is the home of the Long family, known as "New Zealand's most remote family". It is a two-day walk to the nearest civilisation in Haast. Robert Long began living there in 1980.

See also
List of rivers of New Zealand

References

Land Information New Zealand - Search for Place Names

Westland District
Rivers of the West Coast, New Zealand
Rivers of New Zealand